Mount Fenton is a peak  high, rising from the northern part of Skinner Ridge,  northeast of Mount Mackintosh, in Victoria Land, Antarctica. It was mapped by the United States Geological Survey from surveys and U.S. Navy air photos, 1956–62, and was named by the Advisory Committee on Antarctic Names for Michael D. Fenton, a geologist at McMurdo Station, 1965–66.

References 

Mountains of Victoria Land
Scott Coast